Matjaž Poklukar (born 30 January 1973) is a Slovenian biathlete. He competed in the men's 20 km individual event at the 2006 Winter Olympics.

References

1973 births
Living people
Slovenian male biathletes
Olympic biathletes of Slovenia
Biathletes at the 2006 Winter Olympics
Sportspeople from Jesenice, Jesenice